Terence "Terry" McLaughlin (born 1956) is a Canadian sailor who has competed in the Olympics.

Biography

McLaughlin was born July 24, 1956, in Toronto, Ontario to Paul McLaughlin and his wife Mary. His father  competed in the 1948 Olympic dinghy regatta. He attended St. Michael's College School and then majored in economics at Queen's University.

McLaughlin won a silver medal in the Flying Dutchman Class at the Los Angeles 1984 Summer Olympics with Evert Bastet. He was to have competed in the Moscow 1980 Summer Olympics but did not, due to the boycott of the event by western countries.

McLaughlin helmed Canada One in the 1983 Louis Vuitton Cup which determines the challenger for the America’s Cup.

McLaughlin has won the York Cup match-racing series five times

McLaughlin skippered Defiant, out of RCYC, to win the 2001, 2003,  2021 and 2022 editions of the Canada's Cup.

He was awarded the 2001 and 2013 Rolex Sailor of the Year.

McLaughlin skippered the Royal Canadian Yacht Club Swan 42 yacht Daring owned by John Hele to win the 2011 and 2013 New York Yacht Club Invitational Cups and the 2013 Swan 42 National Championships.

McLaughlin and his crew  Sandy Andrews, David Ogden, and David Jarvis won the J24 silver medal at the XVII Pan American Games in Toronto in 2015.

In his own J105 Mandate he won the J105 North American Championships with crews, which have included Graham Hicks, Fraser Howell, Evert McLaughlin and John Millen in 2014, 2016 and 2018.

References

External links
 
 

1956 births
Living people
Canadian male sailors (sport)
Olympic sailors of Canada
Olympic silver medalists for Canada
Olympic medalists in sailing
Medalists at the 1984 Summer Olympics
Sailors at the 1984 Summer Olympics – Flying Dutchman
Pan American Games silver medalists for Canada
Sailors at the 2015 Pan American Games
Sportspeople from Toronto
Pan American Games medalists in sailing
1983 America's Cup sailors
Medalists at the 2015 Pan American Games